Purohita Thirunarayana Narasimhachar (17 March 1905 – 13 October 1998), commonly known as PuTiNa, was a playwright and poet in the Kannada language. Along with, Kuvempu and D. R. Bendre, he forms the well-known trio of Kannada Navodaya poets. He was a Sahitya Akademi fellow and the winner of the Pampa Award, awarded by the Government of Karnataka in 1991.

Life and career
Narasimhachar was born on 17 March 1905 into an orthodox Iyengar family in the town of Melkote in Mandya district of Karnataka.

Apart from being a writer, PuTiNa also worked in the army of Mysore state and later in the legislature of the Government of Mysore state. He died on 13 October 1998.

Literary contributions
PuTiNa was one of the catalysts of the Navodaya style of Kannada literature. According to Lakshminarayana Bhat, "At a broader level, the growth of the Navodaya style of literature resembles the growth of the writings of PuTiNa". In his first collection of poems Hanathe, he conveys profound insights into significant moments in life by using a simple language and style. Many of PuTiNa's writings detail the beauty and majesty of nature, bordering on the spiritual. Two of his well-known writings are Ahalye, which subtly narrates the conflict between kama and dharma, and Gokula Nirgamana, which narrates the departure of Krishna from Gokula. PuTiNa's essays reflect his dominant poetic personality.

Awards and recognitions
 Kendra Sahitya Academy Award in 1966 for his work "Hamsa Damayanti Mattu Itara Roopakagalu" 
 Pampa Prashasthi in 1991 from Karnataka Government
 Padma Shri from the Government of India, 1991

Bibliography

Collection of poems
Hanate
Mandaliru
Sharadayaamini
Hrudaya vihari
Ganesha darshana
Rasa Sarasvati
Maley Degula
Irula Meragu
Haley Chiguru – Hosa Beru
Raaga raagini
honala haadu

Musical dramas
 Vasanta Chandana
 Seeta Kalyana
 Ahalye
 Gokula Nirgamana
 Shabari
 Doniya Binada
 Vikatakavi
 Ramapatabisheka

Collection of stories
 Ramachariya Nenapu
 Rathasaptami and other stories
 Sri Rama Pattabhiskekham
 Hamsa Damayanti
 Eechalu marad kelage

Notes

References

 Documentary by Chadrashekhar Kambar

External links
An essay of PuTiNa's poetry
A dance production based on PuTiNa's poetry

Kannada poets
People from Mandya district
1905 births
1998 deaths
Recipients of the Sahitya Akademi Award in Kannada
Kannada dramatists and playwrights
Maharaja's College, Mysore alumni
20th-century Indian poets
20th-century Indian dramatists and playwrights
Indian male poets
Poets from Karnataka
Indian male dramatists and playwrights
Recipients of the Padma Shri in literature & education
Dramatists and playwrights from Karnataka
20th-century Indian male writers